Surabaya–Mojokerto Toll Road or Sumo Toll Road, is a part of Trans-Java toll road in Java, Indonesia, that length of the toll road is 36.1 kilometres.

This toll road connects the city of Surabaya (largest city in East Java) and Mojokerto Regency, in the west this toll road is connected with Kertosono–Mojokerto Toll Road.

History
The construction of this toll road began in 2007. Parts of the toll that has been operating is the 2.3-kilometre section IA (Waru–Sepanjang, inaugurated 27 August 2011) as well as the 18.47-kilometre section IV (Krian–Mojokerto, inaugurated 19 March 2016). While sections IB 4.3 km (Sepanjang-WRR), II 5.1 km (WRR-Driyorejo), and III 6.1 km (Driyorejo–Krian) are planned to be fully operational in 2017.

Indonesian President Joko Widodo inaugurated Section 1B, 2 and 3 of the toll road on 19 December 2017. Thus the total length of the toll road now fully operational.  The exits on the Surabaya-Mojokerto toll are Waru, Sepanjang, WORR, Driyorejo, Krian, and Mojokerto.

Sections
Sumo Toll Road has following sections,

Section 1A : 2.3 km of toll road connecting Waru and Sepanjang, 
Section 1B : 4.3 km of toll road connecting Sepanjang and Western Ring Road;
Section 2 : 5.1 km of toll road connecting Western Ring Road and Driyorejo;
Section 3 : 6.1 km of toll road connecting Driyorejo and Krian; and
Section 4 : 18.47 km of toll road connecting Krian and Mojokerto.

Exits

References 

Toll roads in Indonesia
Transport in East Java